Dear David is an upcoming American supernatural thriller film directed by John McPhail, based on Adam Ellis' Twitter thread of the same name. It stars Augustus Prew as Ellis with Justin Long and Andrea Bang in supporting roles. The film is the third co-production between BuzzFeed Studios and Lionsgate Films.

Premise
Former BuzzFeed employee Adam Ellis becomes haunted by the ghost of a boy possessed by a demonic entity.

Cast
 Augustus Prew as Adam Ellis
 Justin Long as the head of BuzzFeed
 Andrea Bang

Production
Dear David was a Twitter thread created by BuzzFeed writer Adam Ellis in which he describes his encounter with a ghost. The story was updated between August 7 and December 12, 2017, and went viral online, gaining Ellis over 1 million followers on Twitter. On June 6, 2018, BuzzFeed Studios announced its plan to adapt the story into a feature film, with Mike Van Waes writing the screenplay. In an interview, Ellis said his story was based on actual events and that he had "never been interested in convincing anyone that ghosts are real – I just wanted to tell my story." In November 2018, New Line Cinema acquired the rights to the story.

In July 2020, BuzzFeed Studios and Lionsgate Films announced a partnership to produce and distribute a number of feature films. In November 2021, BuzzFeed and Lionsgate acquired the rights to the story from New Line Cinema and hired John McPhail to direct. Production took place in Toronto, Canada, and wrapped in December 2021. In January 2022, Justin Long, Augustus Prew, and Andrea Bang were confirmed to star.

Release
The film is scheduled to be released by Lionsgate.

References

External links
 

Upcoming films
American supernatural thriller films
Films about spirit possession
Films based on Internet-based works
Films shot in Toronto
Lionsgate films
Upcoming English-language films
Films directed by John McPhail